Marco Scotini (born 1964) is an Italian curator, writer and art critic based in Milan, where he is artistic director of the FM Center for Contemporary Art and Head of the Visual Arts and Curatorial Studies Department at NABA.

During his career, Scotini has curated more than two hundred solo exhibitions of artists. He has collaborated with art institutions as Documenta, Manifesta, Van Abbemusuem, SALT, Museo Reina Sofia, Castello di Rivoli, Nottingham Contemporary, MIT, Raven Row, Ludwing Múzeum Budapest, MSU Zagreb and Bildmuseet Umeå.

He curated the Albanian Pavilion at the Venice Biennale in 2015 and co-curated three editions of the Prague Biennale, in 2003, 2005, and 2007.

His project, "Disobedience Archive", traveled for 10 years in several European countries, United States and Mexico.
He was  artistic director  of the Gianni Colombo Archive from 2004 to 2016, organizing retrospective exhibitions of Colombo's work at the Neue Galerie am Landesmuseum Joanneum Graz, Haus Konstruktiv Zurich and Castello di Rivoli together with Carolyn Christov-Bakargiev.

Scotini is also the founder of the bookzine No Order: Art in a Post-Fordist Society, published by Archive Books in Berlin. Scotini has written essays for Italian and international magazines, including Moscow Art Magazine, Springerin, Flash Art, Domus, Manifesta Journal, Kaleidoscope, Brumaria, Chto Delat?/What is to be done?, Open, South as a State of Mind, Arte e Critica, Millepiani, and Alfabeta.

Selected exhibitions
Starting from the Desert: Ecologies on the Edge, 2nd Yinchuan Biennale，MOCA Yinchuan, Yinchuan, China (2018)
The Szechwan Tale: Theatre and History，1st Anren Biennale, Anren, China (2017)
Piero Gilardi: Nature Forever, MAXXI, Rome (2017)
The White Hunter: Memories and African Representations, FM Centre for Contemporary Art, Milan (2017)
EarthRise, ecologEast and The Green Tent (Das Grüne Zelt), PAV, Turin (2015-2016)
Non-Aligned Modernity, FM Centre for Contemporary Art, Milan (2016)
The Unarchivable: Italy 1970s, FM Centre for Contemporary Art, Milan (2016)
Too Early, Too Late: Middle East and Modernity, Pinacoteca Nazionale, Bologna (2015)

Selected publications
“Politics of Memory: Documentary and Archive” (DeriveApprodi, Rome 2014, and Archive Books, Berlin 2015);
“Deimantas Narkevičius: Da Capo. Fifteen Films” (Archive Books, Berlin 2015);
“Artecrazia: Macchine espositive e governo dei pubblici” (DeriveApprodi, Roma 2016),
“Politiques de la végétation: Pratiques artistiques, stratégies communautaires, agroécologie” (Eterotopia France, Paris 2017);
“Gianni Pettena: Not Conscious Architecture” (SternbergPress, Berlin 2017).

References

Italian art curators
Italian art critics
Italian male writers
Living people
Curators from Milan
1964 births